Snapt Inc. was a software company that provides load balancing, acceleration, security and caching for websites, applications and services.  Snapt shut down in August, 2022

The company's primary products are Snapt Aria and Snapt Nova, both application delivery controller or ADCs.

History

Snapt Inc. was founded in 2012 in South Africa and had an office and headquarters, in Cape Town, South Africa.

Competitors include: F5 Networks, KEMP Technologies, Cisco Systems, and Citrix Systems.

Snapt shut down in August, 2022

Business

Snapt Inc.’s product range helps optimize and offload content through load balancing, web acceleration, web application firewalling and global server load balancing. It spread requests between various servers to ensure that websites, applications, and services load as quickly as possible.

The company achieved year-on-year growth of 400% in both 2014 and 2015.  

In 2016, Snapt Inc's load balancing and web acceleration offering had been used by over 10,000 clients in 50 countries  including: Intel, Target, Cisco Systems and MTV. 
 In mid-2016, the company raised $1 million in investment funding, from private equity and venture capital firm, Convergence Partners.

In mid-2018, the company raised a further $3 million in series A funding, from private equity and venture capital firm, Convergence Partners, Nedbank and other investors.

In August, 2022, Snapt lost investor funding and closed its doors, releasing all employees.

Technology
Snapt Inc's ADC solution includes a layer 7 load balancer, web accelerator for web acceleration and caching, as well as a web application firewall.
 
The company's offerings are virtual machine (VM), Kubernetes and cloud-based.

External links

References

Software companies based in California
Software companies established in 2012
2012 establishments in California